Scopula desita is a moth of the  family Geometridae. It is found from Australia to the Sunda Islands, 
Tenimbar Islands and the Philippines.

Subspecies
Scopula desita desita (Australia)
Scopula desita luzonica Prout, 1931 (Philippines: Luzon)

References

Moths described in 1861
desita
Moths of Asia
Moths of Australia